Ceri is a town in Lazio, Italy.

Ceri may also refer to:

People
 Ceri Dallimore (born 1974), Welsh sport shooter
 Ceri Richards (1903–1971), Welsh artist
 Ceri Warnock, British-born New Zealand environmental legal scholar
 Luciano Ceri (born 1951), Italian singer-songwriter, journalist and radio host
 Renzo da Ceri (c. 1476–1536), Italian condottiero
 Siôn Ceri (fl. 16th-century), Welsh language poet

Places
 Cêri, a village in Tibet

See also 
 Cerri, an Italian surname
 Cherry (disambiguation)
 Chieri (disambiguation)
 Kerry (disambiguation)
 Keri (disambiguation)